Nazirabad Thanda is a tribal village under Pargi jurisdiction in Rangareddy District, in the Indian state of Telangana. The name Thanda derives from the fact that only Lambadi(Banjara) community people live there. The population is greater than 1,000 people.

Villages in Ranga Reddy district